The 2016–17 season was the sixth season of the SEHA (South East Handball Association) League and third under the sponsorship of the Russian oil and gas company Gazprom. Ten teams from seven countries (Belarus, Bosnia and Herzegovina, Croatia, Hungary, Macedonia, Slovakia and Slovenia) participated in that year's competition.

Telekom Veszprém were the defending champions. The SEHA League was consisted of two phases – the first has 18 rounds in which all teams play one home and one away game against each other. After that, the four best ranked clubs played on the Final Four tournament.

The campaign began on 30 August 2016 with the match between last year's runner up Vardar and fourth placed Meshkov Brest. The regular season ended on 16 March 2017, with the decisive match between PPD Zagreb and Meshkov Brest.

The Final Four tournament was held in the city of Brest and organised in cooperation with Meshkov Brest, from 7 April to 9 April 2017.

Team information

Venues and locations

Personnel and kits
Following is the list of clubs competing in 2016–17 SEHA League, with their manager, team captain, kit manufacturer and shirt sponsor.

Coaching changes

Regular season

Standings

Results

Final four
The final four will be held at the Universal Sports Complex Victoria in Brest, Belarus on 7 and 9 April 2017.

Format
The first-placed team of the group faces the fourth-placed team, and the second-placed team will play against the third-placed team from the other group in the final four.

Semifinals

Match for third place

Final

References

External links 
 Official website

SEHA League
2016–17 domestic handball leagues